Meathop and Ulpha is a former civil parish, now in the parish of Witherslack, Meathop and Ulpha, in the South Lakeland district of Cumbria, England. It contained four listed buildings that are recorded in the National Heritage List for England.  All the listed buildings are designated at Grade II, the lowest of the three grades, which is applied to "buildings of national importance and special interest".  Much of the parish was salt marsh, and the listed buildings consisted of three bridges and a house.


Buildings

References

Citations

Sources

Lists of listed buildings in Cumbria
South Lakeland District